Alexander S. Bermange is a composer and lyricist whose musicals and theatre productions have enjoyed successful runs in the West End and around the world, whose comic writing is regularly listened to by millions of listeners to BBC Radio, and whose songs have been recorded and released by many international singing stars.

Education
Bermange was educated at the University of Oxford.

Career
Bermange's music and lyrics have been heard in the West End in The 24 Hour Musicals at the Old Vic and Plague Over England at the Duchess Theatre, and in venues all over the UK in Murder on Air, several star-studded productions of which have had successful runs in various regional theatres, and which has additionally enjoyed two extensive UK tours.

Since graduating from Oxford University, Bermange has also written the music and lyrics for the musicals The Route To Happiness (Landor Theatre, London; also recorded by Kerry Ellis, Ben Forster and Louise Dearman), Thirteen Days (Arcola Theatre, London; Kiveton Park, Sheffield; and the subject of a prime-time BBC Radio 4 programme), Walking on the Sun (The O2, London, and three productions in Yorkshire), Odette (Bridewell Theatre, London), Aladdin (Pleasance Theatre, London), Shadowless (Bridewell Theatre, London; cast album also released), Close Encounters (Century City Playhouse, Los Angeles), Dead Heat (Bradford Playhouse) and Nessie (Musical Kongress, Hamburg); and the music for Snow White, The Blue Light, Sleeping Beauty, King Drosselbart, The Seven Ravens, The Golden Goose, The Frog Prince and Beauty and the Beast – The Singing Springing Lark (all produced over successive summers at the Amphitheater Park Schloss Philippsruhe, Hanau, Germany; most released on CD and/or DVD, and one also staged in Yaroslavl, Russia), and The Lost Fairy Tales, a compilation show comprising songs from these (two tours of Germany and Switzerland). Alexander is the winner of two Frank Wildhorn Awards for Musical Theatre for his musical Shadowless (Musical Festival Graz, Austria).

Bermange has written and performed many comic songs for Broadcasting House on BBC Radio 4, and Weekend and The World Today on the BBC World Service. His solo cabaret The Wit & Whimsy of Alexander S. Bermange (St James Theatre and The Pheasantry, London) celebrates this style of his writing. His witty ditties have also been performed by the likes of Kit & The Widow (at London's Coliseum, Cadogan Hall, Wigmore Hall and Arts Theatre, the Edinburgh Festival, and on Friday Night Is Music Night on BBC Radio 2), Britt Ekland, and 4 Poofs & A Piano, featured in Miriam Margolyes's A Few of Our Favourite Things with Stephen Fry (Theatre Royal, Winchester), and included in his own comic musical entertainment Weird & Wonderful (Canal Café Theatre, London). A total of 42 of Alexander's comic songs have been released on the two albums Weird & Wonderful and Wit & Whimsy, which feature all-star line-ups of popular personalities and international musical theatre artists.

Twenty tracks from Bermange's musicals have been released on the CD Act One, featuring 26 leading West End stars and produced by Mike Dixon. Performances of The Songs of Alexander S. Bermange have been staged with the New Frankfurt Philharmonic Orchestra; as a radio concert for Bayerischer Rundfunk in Munich; at the Amphitheater Park Schloss Philippsruhe, Hanau, Germany, and with European musical theatre star Felix Martin at the Musical Kongress, Hamburg, the last of which led to the release of a CD maxi single of songs from Alexander's shows, entitled Walking on the Sun – Felix Martin Sings Alexander S. Bermange. Further songs of Alexander's have been released on Sony Music's star-studded CD set Musical Emotions, which features two tracks by him; Kit & The Widow's album 100 Not Out and DVD Live at Cadogan Hall; German musical theatre and television star Kevin Koehler's solo CD, Lost in Light, which includes two of Alexander's songs; the original London cast recording of A Song Cycle For Soho; The West End Goes MAD For Christmas, Standing Ovation and If You Were Mine, three collections of songs performed by stars of the London stage; Märchenhaft, a compilation of highlights from musicals premiered at the Hanau Festival featuring four tracks by Alexander; and West End musical theatre artists Chris Thatcher's, Simon Green's and Morgan Crowley's respective solo CDs Jesus Chris Superstar, Take Me to the World and West End Wounds, Broadway Bruises.

Bermange's other commissions include the songs for the Toyota corporate show Premiere (ICC, Birmingham); the theme song for Mission 007 (Capitol Theater, Düsseldorf); comic songs for A Song Cycle For Soho (Soho Theatre, London, and cast album), West End musical theatre artist Jessica Martin's Unlimited Engagement (Jermyn Street Theatre, London) and the stage production Bitesize (King's Head Theatre, London); and the English adaptation of the theme from the musical Blue Bear (for German publisher Whale Songs).  He has composed the music for the film N.R.O.H. (Tropfest Film Festival, Sydney) and for numerous plays at the Open Air Theatre, Regent's Park, the King's Head Theatre and the Jermyn Street Theatre, London. He has contributed additional lyrics to the musicals Snap! (Jermyn Street Theatre, London) and All The Divas of Arabia (Edinburgh Festival), and original music to Stalin! (Pleasance Theatre, London).

Bermange has worked extensively as a musical director, accompanist and repetiteur both on his own musicals and on others including Guys And Dolls (Cadogan Hall, London) and the stage premiere of Leonard Bernstein's Peter Pan (King's Head Theatre, London) – in conjunction with both of which he also gave performances on BBC Radio 3's In Tune; The Snowman (Birmingham Repertory Theatre and Edinburgh Festival Theatre), Closer Than Ever (Bridewell Theatre, London), the London premiere of Charles Hart's Love Songs (Bridewell Theatre, London), the CD Petula Clark – In Her Own Write, cabaret residencies with Janie Dee (The Hippodrome, London and The Pheasantry, London), and Baroque To Broadway and Christmas on Broadway, two radio concerts for Deutsche Welle. He has also given songwriting workshops for the Cambridge Arts Theatre and the Orpheus Centre.

Bermange has also frequently been heard on BBC London 94.9 as a contributor on The Late Show and the Sunday Night Sessions, on BBC Three Counties Radio as a newspaper reviewer on Saturday Breakfast, and on Radio Verulam interviewing diverse entertainment personalities.

External links
Alexander S. Bermange's official website
Alexander S. Bermange on Facebook
Brueder Grimm Maerchenfestspiele
Review of Odette in The Stage
Review of Plague Over England in Variety
Interview with Alexander S. Bermange on Plays to See
Article about Alexander S. Bermange on Whats on Stage

English songwriters
English lyricists
English Jews
Alumni of St Edmund Hall, Oxford
Living people
Year of birth missing (living people)